Aldinga may also refer to:

Aldinga, South Australia, a locality
Aldinga Bay, a bay
Aldinga Football Club, an Australian rules football club
Aldinga Airfield, an airfield

See also
Aldinga Beach, South Australia
Aldinga Scrub Conservation Park
Aldinga Reef Aquatic Reserve